Green Acres is an unincorporated community in Ross Township, Lake County, Indiana. It is mostly the Green Acres subdivision, located just east of Colorado St between 73rd Ave (Old Lincoln Highway) and US 30.

Geography

References

Unincorporated communities in Lake County, Indiana
Unincorporated communities in Indiana